Cottrell is an unincorporated crossroads community in north Clackamas County, Oregon, United States. It was founded by Georgia (Maiden name Cottrell. ) Andrews, the wife of Charles Ida Andrews (married 1893).  Georgia and her mother Carrie Arabella (Townsley) Cottrell moved to Oregon from Milwaukee, Wisconsin after Georgia's father and Carrie's husband George Cottrell, was killed in a railroad accident. Georgia typically went by and wrote her name as 'Georgie'.  There was a Cottrell post office from 1894 until 1904; it probably closed when Rural Free Delivery was extended to the area. There is also a Cottrell Road and a Cottrell school a mile east of the locale, and there was a Cottrell station on the defunct Mount Hood Electric Railway line about a mile to the north. The now-abandoned station was across the county line in Multnomah County.  Georgia and her mother Carrie both died in Ashland, in 1953 and 1943 respectively.

See also
Johnson Creek (Willamette River)

References

External links 
 Cottrell Community Planning Organization

Portland metropolitan area
Unincorporated communities in Clackamas County, Oregon
1894 establishments in Oregon
Populated places established in 1894
Unincorporated communities in Oregon